Anak Agung Ngurah Wahyu Trisnajaya (born 28 July 1988) better known as Ngurah Nanak, is an Indonesian professional footballer who plays as a centre-back for Liga 2 club Persela Lamongan.

Club career
On 30 November 2014, he was signed again by Sriwijaya.

Honours

Club
Sriwijaya
 Piala Indonesia: 2010
Semen Padang
 Liga 2 runner-up: 2018

References

External links
 

1988 births
Living people
Indonesian footballers
Balinese sportspeople
People from Denpasar
Persitara Jakarta Utara players
Persija Jakarta players
Bali United F.C. players
Sriwijaya F.C. players
Semen Padang F.C. players
PSIM Yogyakarta players
Persiba Balikpapan players
Liga 1 (Indonesia) players
Liga 2 (Indonesia) players
Association football central defenders
Sportspeople from Bali